The line of Gennari (also called the "band" or "stria" of Gennari) is a band of myelinated axons that runs parallel to the surface of the cerebral cortex on the banks of the calcarine fissure in the occipital lobe. This formation is visible to the naked eye as a white strip running through the cortical grey matter, and is the reason the V1 in primates is also referred to as the "striate cortex." The line of Gennari is due to dense axonal input from the thalamus to layer IV of visual cortex. It is the name given to the enlarged external band of Baillarger. The structure is named for its discoverer, Francesco Gennari, who first observed it in 1776 as a medical student at the University of Parma. He described it in a book which he published six years later. Although non-primate species have areas that are designated primary visual cortex, some (if not all) lack a stria of Gennari.

See also
 Cerebral cortex
 Brodmann area
 Insular cortex

External links
Horizontal section of human brain showing line of Gennari from Polyak (1957)

References

Cerebral cortex
Occipital lobe